Dabur Vatika Miss Nepal 2003, the 9th Miss Nepal beauty contest, was held on September 13, 2003, at the Birendra International Conference Convention Centre in Nepal. It was won by Priti Sitoula, of Kathmandu. 

The show was broadcast live by Nepal Television but suffered from minor technical glitches. 

The contestants were supported by fashion designer groups INIFD, NEFT, Lakhotia and others. The event differed from previous pageants in that it featured modifications of Nepal's traditional ethnic dresses. Designs from INIFD (International Institute of Fashion Design) were judged to be better than the dresses from competing designers.

Namrata Shrestha hosted the show. The Winner of Miss Nepal 2003, Priti Sitoula, represented Nepal in the Miss World 2003 pageant in Sanya, China. The 1st runner up, Prerana Shah, represented Nepal in the Miss Asia Pacific 2003.

Results

Color keys

Sub-Titles

Judges
 Mrs Chhaua Sharma - Founder/ Director of Nepal College of Travel & Tourism
 Mr Narayan P. Sharma - Principal, Budhanilkantha School
 Mrs Niru Shrestha - Miss Nepal 1998
 Mrs Reetu Simha - Managing Director, Aama Group of Companies
 Mr Siddhartha SJB Rana - Chairman, Soaltee Group (P) Ltd
 Ms Sanyukta Shrestha - Managing Director, The Signature Style Boutique
 Mr Sushil Pant - Executive Director, Jurist & co (P) Ltd
 Mrs Anjan Shakya - Lecture, Padma Kanya Campus
 Mr Arun Kumar K.C - Managing Director, Cotton Comfort (P) Ltd
 Mr Diwaker Rajkarnikar - President, Nepal cancer Relief Society
 Mr Narendra Bhattarai - President, Nepal Bankers Association

Contestants

Notes
 Contestant #11, Prerana Shah was crowned as the 2nd runner up in Miss Teen Nepal 2002.

References

External links
 Miss Nepal website
 Miss Nepal 2003 Website

 
Beauty pageants in Nepal
2003 in Nepal
Miss Nepal